Contempt: A Memoir of the Clinton Investigation is a memoir by Ken Starr about the impeachment of Bill Clinton, published in 2018.

References

2018 non-fiction books
Books about Bill Clinton
Works about the impeachment of Bill Clinton
Sentinel (publisher) books